Sainte-Anne is a village and commune in the French overseas department of Martinique.

Geography

Climate
Sainte-Anne has a tropical monsoon climate (Köppen climate classification Am).

Population

See also
Communes of the Martinique department

References

External links
Tourism Office 

Communes of Martinique
Populated places in Martinique